Marco Polo is an opera by the Chinese-born composer Tan Dun set to an English libretto by Paul Griffiths. It premiered in Munich on 7 May 1996. Described variously as an "opera within an opera" and a "fantasia on an epic journey", the multi-layered storyline is loosely based on the journey of Marco Polo from Venice to China. In the opera, Marco Polo becomes two characters: Marco, who represents the real person and is sung by a mezzo-soprano, and Polo who represents his memory and is sung by a tenor. The work is scored for vocal soloists, a chorus of 20 and a large orchestra of both modern and medieval European instruments as well as instruments from the cultures that Marco Polo passed through on his journey, including sitar, pipa, sheng, tabla and Tibetan horns and bells. Marco Polo won the 1998 Grawemeyer Award for Music Composition.

Performance history
Marco Polo began as a commission by the Edinburgh International Festival in the late 1980s. However, it was not completed until 1995 and received its first performance at the Munich Biennale on 7 May 1996 directed by Martha Clarke. Its US premiere followed on 8 November 1997 at the New York City Opera. Marco Polo was first seen in the UK in November 1998 in a concert performance at the Huddersfield Contemporary Music Festival. Its most recent revival was a November 2008 production at De Nederlandse Opera in Amsterdam

Roles
Memory: Polo (tenor)
Being 1: Marco (mezzo-soprano)
Being 2: Kublai Khan (bass)
Nature: Water (soprano)
Shadow 1: Rustichello/Li Po (tenor)
Shadow 2: Sheherazada/Mahler/Queen (mezzo-soprano)
Shadow 3: Dante/Shakespeare (baritone)

Recordings
Marco Polo (CD Sony 62912) - World premiere recording with Thomas Young and Alexandra Montano in the title roles, the Cappella Amsterdam, and the Netherlands Radio Chamber Orchestra conducted by the composer. Recorded live at Yakult Hall, Amsterdam on 20 June 1996. 
Marco Polo (DVD Opus Arte OA1010D) - The 2008 production of the opera by De Nederlandse Opera, with Charles Workman and Sarah Castle in the title roles and conducted by the composer.

Notes and references

Sources
G. Schirmer, Tan Dun: Marco Polo, programme notes. Accessed 31 August 2009.
Kerner, Leighton, "Mind voyager", The Village Voice, 11 November 1997. Accessed via subscription 31 August 2009.
Smith, Patrick J., "Tan Dun: Marco Polo", Opera News, December 1997. Accessed via subscription 31 August 2009.
White, Michael, "Huddersfield, centre of the musical universe", The Independent, 29 November 1998. Accessed 31 August 2009.

Operas by Tan Dun
Operas
Operas set in China
1996 operas
English-language operas
Cultural depictions of Marco Polo
Yuan dynasty in fiction
Operas set in the 13th century
Operas based on real people
Operas about writers
Cultural depictions of Kublai Khan
Cultural depictions of William Shakespeare